Albert O'Connor (23 October 1893 – 28 August 1944) was an Australian rules footballer who played for the Essendon Football Club in the Victorian Football League (VFL).

Notes

External links 
		

1893 births
1944 deaths
Australian rules footballers from Victoria (Australia)
Essendon Football Club players